Hokuei may refer to:

 Hokuei, Tottori, a town located in Tōhaku District of Tottori, Japan
 Shunbaisai Hokuei, a designer of ukiyo-e style Japanese woodblock prints